Vaux-sur-Aure (literally Vaux on Aure) is a commune in the Calvados department in the Normandy region in northwestern France.

The Barons de Gratot (Argouges) resided at the Château de Gratot in Vaux-sur-Aure. According to the French Wikipedia a legend is that a Lord of Argouges met a Fairy woman who agreed to be his wife provided he never spoke the word "Mort" [death] which was considered profane language; however he spoke it and the Fairy vanished; this legend is associated with both Château de Gratot and the Château de Argouges at Argouges.

Population

International relations
Vaux-sur-Aure has international relations with the city of Nagasaki, Japan, since 2005. It was a sister city of Sotome, now a subdivision of Nagasaki, since 1978.

See also
Communes of the Calvados department

References

Communes of Calvados (department)
Calvados communes articles needing translation from French Wikipedia